Mastbaum may refer to:
Blair Mastbaum (1979- ), American writer
Etta Wedell Mastbaum (1866–1953), American businesswoman and philanthropist
Jules Mastbaum (1872-1926), American businessman and philanthropist